Battlefield is a district in the Scottish city of Glasgow. It is situated south of the River Clyde. The area takes its name from the Battle of Langside of 1568 in which Mary, Queen of Scots' army was defeated by forces acting in the name of her infant son, James VI. A highly decorative monument, designed by Alexander Skirving in 1887, now stands adjacent to Queen's Park commemorating the 320th anniversary of her defeat.

Housing consists mainly of three and four-storey Victorian and Edwardian tenements, although there are also numerous townhouses from the same era, and some modern properties.

Battlefield was formerly a centre of Glasgow's Jewish community, although most have now moved further south to Giffnock and Newton Mearns, or further afield to Manchester or Israel. The former synagogue had been converted to flats for social rent by Arklet Housing Association, now part of Hanover Scotland Housing Asscoaition.

The area includes one of Glasgow's main hospitals, the New Victoria Hospital (and the buildings of the (old) Victoria Infirmary), and further education institutions, Langside College. Another key local landmark, the Battlefield Rest building and clocktower, is now a restaurant, as is The Church on the Hill, previously the Langside Hill Church.

Langside Library, at the junction of Sinclair Drive and Battlefield Road, is the final Carnegie library in Glasgow.

The Southside Festival takes place in Queens Park in May annually. It celebrates the cultural diversity and uniqueness of the Southside of the city.

References

External links
Life in the Southside of Glasgow
Architecture in Battlefield and Langside
Southside Festival

Areas of Glasgow